Arwal town is the administrative headquarters of Arwal district in Bihar state of India. It was earlier part of Jehanabad district. The district as formed to control the naxalism in the area. District was formed from the area of two near by districts i.e. Jehanabad and Aurangabad. Arwal has a population of 588,000. Arwal, the district headquarters is approximately 80 km south from the state capital Patna. Arwal town is situated on the right side bank of the Sone River, which is a tributary to the Ganges.

Geography
The district headquarters is in Arwal near river (Sone). The state capital, Patna is 65 km to the north.

Language
The official languages are Hindi and Urdu. The regional language spoken here is Magahi.

Economy
Economy of the district is totally agriculture Based and this area does not have any presence of any Industry. Paddy, wheat and maize are the main crops. In March 2008 the Bihar government approved the construction of a bridge across the Son River at a cost of Rs. 9,742 lakhs from Arwal to Sahar in Bhojpur district. The economy of Arwal depends on agriculture only. Most of the population resides in villages and are farmers. The entire district is well irrigated due to the proper arrangement of canals, except area like Kurtha, Vanshi and Karpi. There is no existence of any industry or other business centre.

Population
Arwal District Population.

Transport
NH 33 connects Arwal to Bihar Sharif and Farakka. NH 139 passes through Arwal connecting Aurangabad to Patna. The nearest railway station is Jehanabad at 35 km and Anugraha Narayan Road railway station at 60 km.

Notable people

 Tariq Anwar, Cabinet Minister Govt of India
 Akhilesh Prasad Singh, Ex-Minister Govt of India

References